
Gmina Jarczów is a rural gmina (administrative district) in Tomaszów Lubelski County, Lublin Voivodeship, in eastern Poland.

Villages
Gmina Jarczów contains the villages and settlements of Chodywańce, Gródek, Gródek-Kolonia, Jarczów, Jarczów-Kolonia Druga, Jarczów-Kolonia Pierwsza, Jurów, Korhynie, Łubcze, Nedeżów, Plebanka, Przewłoka, Sowiniec, Szlatyn, Wierszczyca, Wola Gródecka, Wola Gródecka-Kolonia and Zawady.

Neighbouring gminas
Gmina Jarczów is bordered by the gminas of Łaszczów, Lubycza Królewska, Rachanie, Tomaszów Lubelski and Ulhówek.

References

Polish official population figures 2006

Jarczow
Tomaszów Lubelski County